Jules Massenet's Piano Concerto is a 1902 work for piano solo and orchestra. It is scored for a typical-sized ensemble of the time. The concerto was performed in 1903 by Louis Diémer at the Conservatoire de Paris. After the premiere, it quickly fell into obscurity and is seldom heard today.

Composition

In 1863, Massenet won the Prix de Rome as a composer, and moved to Rome. He remarked to his sister, "I am working more at the piano. I’m studying Chopin's Études, but especially Beethoven and Bach as the true musician-pianist".  That year, he began sketches for his Piano Concerto.

The work was not completed until 1902, when Massenet was nearing the age of sixty. In a period of three months, Massenet completed the piano concerto.

Premiere
The world premiere of this work occurred on 1 February 1903 at the Paris Conservatoire. The sixty-year-old Louis Diémer, to whom the work was dedicated, was the soloist for the premiere.

Reception
The premiere drew very tepid reviews of both the music and Diémer's execution. The pianist Mark Hambourg remarked on Diémer's playing: "a dry-as-dust player with a hard rattling tone". Thus, there is some speculation that Diémer's playing was to blame for the unpopularity of the concerto.

Furthermore, the concerto was seen as outdated, as Parisian society's tastes had moved away from this salon-style concerto of Massenet.

Structure

The work is in the typical three-movement structure. A typical performance of the work lasts around thirty minutes.

 Andante Moderato (46 = dotted quarter) — Allegro non troppo (84 = dotted quarter). 3/4 time. (14')
 Largo. Massenet provides additional remarks here: "Pour le début, 44 = ♩ et les passages semblables y compris la fin; puis, dans le courant de ce morceau, varier entre 60 = ♩ et 66 = ♩ selon le sentiment." (For the beginning, and similar passages till the end, 44 to a quarter note; then, in the rest of this piece, vary the tempo between 60 and 66 to a quarter, according to the feeling). 4/4 time. (9')
 "Airs slovaques" Allegro. (116 = ♩). 3/4 time. (7')

The first movement begins and ends in E-flat major. It showcases Massenet's operatic side (Massenet was one of the best opera composers in his day). In some ways, it resembles closely Beethoven's 5th piano concerto, especially since both concertos are in the same key, and both have an opening flourish in the piano.

The second movement, in B major, is a slow, deliberate promenade featuring the piano prominently throughout. There are sweeping orchestral flourishes in the middle of this movement. Eventually the music comes to a restful reprise of the theme, and the movement ends quietly in a fading murmur.

The third movement, in C minor, is subtitled "Airs Slovaques", alluding to the ersatz Slovak-like dance tune Massenet uses throughout. The brief 2/4 section towards the end evokes the virtuosic passages of Liszt's Hungarian Rhapsodies, before returning to the main theme, perpetually accelerating into tumbling passages in the piano and flamboyant outbursts in the orchestra. Massenet adds triangle and glockenspiel in this movement to augment the exotic flavor of this movement.

Massenet's piano concerto is one of a handful of works that begins in a major key (E-flat major) and ends in minor (C minor).

Instrumentation
The concerto is scored for piano solo accompanied by an orchestra of typical size:  piccolo, 2 flutes, 2 oboes, 2 clarinets, 2 bassoons, 4 horns, 2 trumpets, 3 trombones, timpani, percussion, and strings.

Discography
A handful of recordings have been made of this concerto.

The recording with Stephen Coombs and the BBC Orchestra was released on Volume 15 of "The Romantic Piano Concerto", on the Hyperion label.

The recording with Adolf Drescher and the Hamburger Symphoniker was released on the Summit label in 1978 but recorded at an unknown date prior to the pianists death in 1967.

The recording with Marylène Dosse and the Westphalian Symphony was released in a 2-CD set entitled "French Piano Concertos", featuring this concerto as well as concertos of Lalo, Roussel and other French composers.

References

External links
 
 Massenet's Piano Concerto, released on Hyperion Records
 Recording by Maryelene Dosse with Siegfried Landau and the Westphalian Symphony Orchestra
 Live performance of the Concerto
 

Compositions by Jules Massenet
Massenet
Compositions in E-flat major
1902 compositions
Music dedicated to ensembles or performers